Michael Grant Terry (born August 30, 1983) is an American actor, known for his recurring role as Wendell Bray on the Fox series Bones.

Biography
Terry was born in Philadelphia, Pennsylvania, the youngest of three children. His father is Will Terry, a former English teacher at the Germantown Friends School, which Michael attended. His mother is Holly Terry, a former third grade teacher at Plymouth Meeting Friends School. He is married to Christine Ciraolo, who was a casting director for Bones. They have a daughter (born September 2019).

He studied cinematography and drama at Emerson College in Boston. During his time at Emerson, he made two student films: Blessed Is He and The Right to Bear Arms.  In 2002, he apprenticed at the prestigious Williamstown Theatre Festival, where he worked on many main stage productions. Shortly thereafter, he moved to Los Angeles, where he worked with Noah Wyle's The Blank Theatre Company. He is also a member of L.A.'s the Brimmer Street Theatre Company. Terry starred in All Your Hard Work, written by Miles Brandman and directed by Michael Matthews in July 2012.

Filmography

References

External links
 
 

1984 births
21st-century American male actors
American male film actors
American male stage actors
American male television actors
Emerson College alumni
Living people
Male actors from Philadelphia
Germantown Friends School alumni